The dump command is a program on Unix and Unix-like operating systems used to back up file systems. It operates on blocks, below filesystem abstractions such as files and directories. Dump can back up a file system to a tape or another disk. It is often used across a network by piping its output through bzip2 then SSH.

A dump utility first appeared in Version 6 AT&T UNIX. A dump command is also part of ASCII's MSX-DOS2 Tools for MSX-DOS version 2.

Usage
 dump [-0123456789acLnSu] [-B records] [-b blocksize] [-C cachesize]
 [-D dumpdates] [-d density] [-f file | -P pipecommand] [-h level]
 [-s feet] [-T date] filesystem

$ dump -W | -w

See also
restore (program)
tar (file format)
cpio
rsync

References

External links
Home page of the Linux Ext2 filesystem dump/restore utilities

Free backup software
Unix archivers and compression-related utilities